Lambright is a surname. Notable people with the surname include:

James H. Lambright, American banker
Jim Lambright (1942–2020), American football player and coach
Maxie Lambright (1924–1980), American football player and coach
Horace Lambright, fictional character

 W. Henry Lambright, American professor of Public Administration

 Wayne Lambright, American Fringe Politician